John Eric Carlson (born June 3, 1959) is an American politician and talk radio host on KVI-AM by Fisher Broadcasting from the state of Washington.
He also co-hosted a show from 12:00PM to 2:00PM Pacific Time called The Commentators, with John Carlson and Ken Schram. The Commentators was discontinued in September, 2010, and starting September 20, 2010, Carlson and Schram each began hosting separate, new shows on the same station. Carlson currently hosts a morning show on KVI called The Commute with Carlson from 6-9AM.

Politics 
Carlson is "right leaning" or "conservative" and often at odds with what he terms Seattle's "liberal elite." He believes that the left leaning political trends that permeate much of urban Seattle are too tolerant of high taxation and criminal behavior.

History

Biographical 
Carlson graduated in 1981 with a bachelor's degree in political science Honors Program at the University of Washington. In late 1999 he was listed as one of the university's one hundred "Alumni of the Century".
In 2008 the UW's alumni magazine listed him as one of its "Wondrous 100" living alumni.

After a brief stint in the Reagan Administration in 1981–82, Carlson served as Communications Director for Washington State Republican Chairman Jennifer Dunn.

Carlson also became a KIRO-TV commentator on the evening news, doing a debate segment with local liberal historian Walt Crowley.  His newspaper column began in 1990 and continues today.

In 1993 Carlson shifted from TV to radio, taking the afternoon drive-time slot on KVI.  Several times he was listed in Talkers Magazine as one of America's 100 leading talk radio hosts.

On June 2, 2011, on the 9 am to noon broadcast of his singular news/talk effort on KOMO 1000 AM radio, among various topics Carlson stood steadfastly by his claim of an emerging scandal involving Anthony Weiner, D-NY, as involves allegations raised by Andrew Breitbart.

He currently hosts a daily program from 6 to 9AM called The Commute with Carlson.

Political activism 
In 1993, Carlson co-authored and led the drive for a new anti-crime initiative he called "Three Strikes You're Out", which began putting three-time violent criminals in prison for life.  The initiative soon spread to California and several other states. Two years later, Carlson and his partner on "Three Strikes", David Lacourse,  passed another initiative called "Hard Time for Armed Crime", which increased sentences for felons caught using or possessing weapons.

In 1998, State Representative Scott Smith and conservative activist Tim Eyman launched Initiative 200, which attempted to prohibit affirmative action preferences.  The campaign was soon handed over to Carlson.  Within three months, the initiative received enough signatures to qualify for the ballot, and in November 1998, voters approved it overwhelmingly, 58%-42% partly due to its language. "(1) The state shall not discriminate against, or grant preferential treatment to, any individual or group on the basis of race, sex, color, ethnicity, or national origin in the operation of public employment, public education, or public contracting."

In 2000, Carlson ran for Governor against popular incumbent Gary Locke.  He won the Republican primary against State Senator Harold Hochstedder, but lost the general election to Locke. Washington has not elected a Republican Governor since 1980.

In 2005, Carlson and KVI morning host Kirby Wilbur encouraged listeners to support initiative 912 to roll back a nine-cent a gallon increase in the state fuel tax.  The initiative gathered 420,000 signatures in 33 days but failed to pass at the polls in November.
Chris Wickham (a Thurston County, Washington, Superior Court Judge) ruled that the comments and activities by Carlson and Wilbur on behalf of the initiative were in-kind contributions that must be reported to the Public Disclosure Commission.
The ruling was later overturned unanimously by the Washington State Supreme Court.

Carlson's articles appear on Crosscut.com, The Seattle Times and his own website, JohnCarlson.com. He maintains both Facebook and Twitter accounts (@KVIJohnCarlson).

Personal 
Carlson rides Indian motorcycles. He has climbed Mount Rainier three times to benefit the Fred Hutchinson Cancer Research Center's Climb to Fight Breast Cancer. He has served on several charity and civic boards.  He is married with two sons and lives in Bellevue, Washington, a Seattle suburb.

References

External links

 TVW, Inside Olympia interview with John Carlson, November 10, 1999
 Seattle Voices, interview with John Carlson, March 3, 2009

1959 births
American talk radio hosts
American television talk show hosts
Living people
People from Bellevue, Washington
Radio personalities from Seattle
Washington (state) Republicans
Candidates in the 2000 United States elections